The Argentina national rugby union team (Spanish: Selección de rugby de Argentina) represents Argentina in men's international rugby union; it is organised by the Argentine Rugby Union. Nicknamed the Pumas (Los Pumas in Spanish), they play in sky blue and white jerseys. They are ranked 6th in the world by World Rugby, making them the highest-ranked nation in the Americas.

Argentina played its first international rugby match in 1910 against a touring British Isles team. Argentina has competed at every Rugby World Cup since the first tournament of 1987, and the country are considered the strongest team within the Americas, being undefeated against all but Canada, against whom they have suffered three losses.

The Pumas' impressive results since the 1999 World Cup have seen rugby's popularity in Argentina grow significantly. Argentina has achieved several upset victories, and are capable of regularly defeating Six Nations sides. In the 2007 Rugby World Cup Argentina were undefeated in their pool and reached the semi-finals for the first time; they were defeated by South Africa in the semi-finals, but followed up with a win over France to claim third place overall. By the end of the competition, the team had reached an all-time high of third in the World Rankings.

After their advances in competitiveness and performance during the 2000s, coupled with their location in the Southern Hemisphere, Argentina was the only tier 1 nation that had no regular competition. Argentina officially joined The Rugby Championship on 23 November 2011. In their first tournament in 2012, Argentina secured a 16–16 draw with The Springboks in only their second game.

The 2014 Rugby Championship saw the first Championship-match win for Argentina who defeated Australia 21–17. 2015 proved to be a successful year for Argentine rugby, including their first ever win over South Africa in the Rugby Championship, and they reached another semi-final at the 2015 Rugby World Cup. In the 2016 Rugby Championship, the Pumas again defeated the Springboks.  Although winless during the 2017 Rugby Championship, the Pumas achieved two wins in their 2018 campaign, defeating both South Africa and Australia. On 14 November 2020, the Pumas beat New Zealand 25–15 to record their first win over the All Blacks, and on August 27, 2022, they defeated the All Blacks for the first time in New Zealand.

History

The History of the Argentina national team starts with the first international played by an Argentine side against the British Isles in 1910 when they toured on South America. Argentina gained recognition in 1965, when the team toured South Africa playing a series of friendly matches there. In that tour the national team was nicknamed Los Pumas, a name that became an identity mark for Argentina, remaining to present days.

Argentina has taken part in all the Rugby World Cups since the first edition in 1987, their best performance being the third place achieved in 2007. Argentina followed their growing competitiveness in the Rugby Championship with a strong showing in the 2015 World Cup, reaching the semi-finals for the second time. The national side has also played in the Rugby Championship since the 2012 edition, after joining the competition one year before.

Colours, symbol and name 

Argentina alternated blue and white jerseys during its first international matches in 1910. In 1927 Mr. Abelardo Gutiérrez of Gimnasia y Esgrima de Buenos Aires proposed that Argentina should play against the British Lions wearing a striped light blue and white jersey. That request was accepted and Argentina wore the striped uniform for the first time in its history.

Los Pumas play in a shirt in the country's flag (and sporting) colours of light blue and white, white shorts, and socks in light blue and white. In 2011, the UAR signed a deal with Nike which became the exclusive kit provider for all its national senior and youth teams, including Pampas XV. The first uniform designed by the American company left the traditional horizontal-striped jersey behind, featuring a single light blue with white shoulders jersey, although it was announced that Los Pumas would wear its traditional uniform again when they play the 2012 Rugby Championship.

In September 1941, Abelardo Gutiérrez (who had proposed the use of a white and blue jersey for the team 14 years prior) suggested a badge with the figure of a lion. The color of the crest was blue (due to Buenos Aires Cricket Club, where the first rugby match in Argentina had been played). The animal was later replaced by a native to Argentine species, so the jaguar was chosen due to his "agility and courage", according to their words.

The Pumas nickname is the result of an error made by Carl Kohler, a journalist for the then Die Transvaler newspaper in South Africa, while following the team during their first overseas tour ever – to Southern Africa (to Rhodesia, now Zimbabwe, and South Africa) in 1965. He tried to devise a catchy nickname for the team similar to existing international team nicknames such as All Blacks, Springboks, and Wallabies. He asked Isak van Heerden, the then coach of the Natal Rugby team who was asked by the SARB to assist with the tour, for ideas. They saw a picture of a type of lion with spots on the UAR crest. Kohler was aware that the Americas had jaguars and pumas, and as he was under pressure to submit his article, made a guess and called them the Pumas, instead of the actual jaguar. The mistake stuck, and was eventually adopted by the Argentines themselves (although the UAR crest still depicts a jaguar).

Kit suppliers

Home grounds

The Pumas use a variety of stadiums when playing at home. One of the most frequently used for tests is José Amalfitani Stadium, home of Club Atlético Vélez Sarsfield and sited in Buenos Aires. When Great Britain made their first tour to Argentina in 1910, the national team played them at Sociedad Sportiva Argentina of Palermo. That test was also notable for being the first Argentina match ever.

When the British combined returned to Argentina in 1927, the national side started to use GEBA and Buenos Aires Cricket Club as their home venues. GEBA was a frequent venue during the next decades, but hosted only three matches after the 1960s, as the Pumas started using larger stadiums; the Pumas last match at GEBA was in 1993. On the other side, the Buenos Aires Cricket was also used for a large number of matches until 1948 when it was destroyed by fire."Buenos Aires Cricket & Rugby Club" at Centro de Documentación, Investigación y Referencia Histórica-Deportiva, June 2009

In 1997 BACRC inaugurated the first purpose-built rugby union stadium in Argentina, erected in Los Polvorines, Greater Buenos Aires. A total of nine international games were played there by the national team until 2005 when it was sold.

Los Pumas played in Ferro Carril Oeste stadium between 1970 and 1986, when Argentina moved to Vélez Sarsfield Stadium. Some of the teams that visited those venues were Ireland, New Zealand, France, and Australia among others."El historial de Los Pumas ante Australia, la tercera potencia", Infobae, 18 October 2015

During the mid year tests in 2007, as well as Vélez Sársfield, Argentina played games at venues including Brigadier Estanislao López in Santa Fe, Malvinas Argentinas in Mendoza, and Gigante de Arroyito, in Rosario. Argentina have also used the River Plate Stadium in the past, and in 2006 hosted Wales at Estadio Raúl Conti in Puerto Madryn.

Other venues that have hosted Argentina rugby team were José M. Minella in Mar del Plata (2008), Monumental José Fierro in Tucumán (2012, 2014), Mario Kempes in Córdoba (2012), Centenario in Resistencia (2014), Padre Martearena in Salta (venue for The Rugby Championship, 2016–2019 editions), Estadio del Bicentenario in San Juan –where the team played tests v England and Wales (2017–18), and Estanislao López in Santa Fe (2017).

Records

Overall

Argentina have won 241 of their 476 Test matches. When the world rankings were introduced by the IRB in October 2003, Argentina were ranked seventh. They fell to eighth in the rankings in June 2004, before rising back to seventh by November that year. They fell back to eighth in February 2005, and stayed there until falling to their lowest ranking of ninth in February 2006. Since then, Argentina rose to eighth in July 2006, then sixth in November of that year. They had a one-week fall to seventh, then one week later rose to fifth to start the World Cup 2007.

Los Pumas twice surpassed their highest ranking at the 2007 Rugby World Cup. Defeating number three France, the second opening game loss for a World Cup hosting nation, moved them into fourth place, their highest position since the IRB World Rankings were established. They lost to eventual champions South Africa in the semi-final but beat France yet again in the bronze medal round to set another highest ranking, third, behind South Africa and New Zealand.

Argentina has won every match against South American national teams, including 41 against Uruguay, 38 against Chile, 17 against Paraguay and 13 against Brazil.

On 14 November 2020, they registered their first win against New Zealand, meaning that they have recorded a victory over every Tier 1 nation.

Below is table of the representative rugby matches played by an Argentina national XV at test level up until 19 November 2022.

Rugby World Cup

The Rugby Championship

Updated: 7 November 2022

Players

Current squad
On 28 October, Michael Cheika named a 33-man squad for Argentina's 2022 End-of-year matches against England, Wales and Scotland.Head coach:  Michael Cheika
 Caps Updated:' 19 November 2022

Coaches
Coaches:

Player records (career)

Most matches

Last updated: Scotland vs Argentina, 19 November 2022. Statistics include officially capped matches only.

Most tries

Last updated: Scotland vs Argentina, 12 November 2022. Statistics include officially capped matches only.

Most points

Last updated: Scotland vs Argentina, 19 November 2022. Statistics include officially capped matches only.

Most matches as captain

Last updated: Scotland vs Argentina, 19 November 2022. Statistics include officially capped matches only.

Player records (match)

Most points in a match

Last updated: Scotland vs Argentina, 19 November 2022. Statistics include officially capped matches only.

Most tries in a match

Last updated: Scotland vs Argentina, 19 November 2022. Statistics include officially capped matches only.

See also
Argentina national rugby sevens team 
Argentina U-20
Argentina XV
Churchill Cup
English Argentine
Puma Trophy
South American Rugby Championship
South American Jaguars

References

External links

 
Los Pumas at Planet Rugby (news about Argentine rugby)
Rugby Fun (news, statistics and results)
Los Pumas at Rugby Time (news, statistics and results)
Los Pumas at El Rugbier (news, statistics and results)
"Argentina's time in the sun", BBC Sport, 24 Jan 2001
"Puma power: Argentinian rugby", BBC Sport, 24 Apr 2006

1910 establishments in Argentina
 
South American national rugby union teams